Sachin S. Lawande (born 1966/67) is an Indian American businessman, the president and CEO of Visteon, a Fortune 500 American automotive electronics company, since June 2015.

Early life
Lawande earned a bachelor's degree in electronics and telecommunications from Bombay University in India, and a master's degree in electrical engineering from Southern Illinois University at Edwardsville.

Career
Lawande joined Harman International Industries in 2006. From 2011 to 2013, Lawande was co-president of Harman's lifestyle and infotainment divisions. From 2013 to 2015, Lawande was executive vice president and president of Harman's infotainment division.

Lawande has been president and CEO of Visteon since June 2015.

In March 2020, Lawande purchased US$251,000 of Visteon stock, at $50.25 per share.

References

Living people
1960s births
American chief executives
Southern Illinois University Edwardsville alumni